Lycée Marie Curie is a senior high school/sixth-form college in Sceaux, Hauts-de-Seine, France, in the Paris metropolitan area. It is a part of the Cité Scolaire Marie Curie along with a junior high school (collège).

 the lycée has about 1,200 students. Together with the junior high the entire cité scolaire has about 1,880 students.

History
It opened in October 1936 as a school for girls. Suzanne Forfer was the school's first director. The Minister of Education, Jean Zay, officially inaugurated the school in 1937. Emile Brunet was the architect of the school building. The school had 500 students around its opening.

References

External links
 Cité Scolaire Marie Curie 

Lycées in Hauts-de-Seine